Mimeusemia is a genus of moths of the family Noctuidae first described by Arthur Gardiner Butler in 1875. Species are found in Japan, India, Sri Lanka and Myanmar.

Description
Veins 9 and 10 of the forewing both anastomosing (fusing) with veins 7 and 8 to form an areole. Claspers of male are large.

Species
 Mimeusemia accurata Swinhoe, 1889
 Mimeusemia albicilia Hampson, 1894
 Mimeusemia amanda Kishida, 1993
 Mimeusemia basalis Walker, 1854
 Mimeusemia centralis Rothschild, 1896
 Mimeusemia ceylonica Hampson, 1893
 Mimeusemia davidsoni Swinhoe, 1899
 Mimeusemia econia Hampson, 1900
 Mimeusemia limbata Jordan, 1939
 Mimeusemia lombokensis Rothschild, 1897
 Mimeusemia perakana Rothschild, 1896
 Mimeusemia persimilis Butler, 1875
 Mimeusemia peshwa Moore, 1858
 Mimeusemia postica Walker, 1862
 Mimeusemia puciola Druce, 1895
 Mimeusemia semyron Herrich-Schäffer, [1853]
 Mimeusemia simplex Lucas, 1891
 Mimeusemia vilemani Hampson, 1911
 Mimeusemia vittata Butler, 1875

References

 Kishida, Y. (1993). "The agaristine moths of south east Asia (3), Description of three new forms of Longicella, Cruriopsis and Mimeusemia (Noctuidae: Agaristinae)." Gekkan-Mushi (269): 12–13.
 
 

Agaristinae